"Streets of Forbes" is an Australian folksong about the death of bushranger Ben Hall. The song is one of the best-known elements of the Australian folk repertoire. It has been recorded by many folk and popular artists and groups including Martin Carthy, The Bushwhackers, Gary Shearston, Niamh Parsons, June Tabor and Weddings Parties Anything. Paul Kelly made his public debut singing the Australian folk song 'Streets Of Forbes' to a Hobart audience in 1974. The Streets of Forbes is usually listed as traditional or anonymous, but Gary Shearston writes that "there are reasons for thinking John McGuire, (Ben Hall's brother in law), may well have been the original author".

Lyrics
Come all of you Lachlan men
and a sorrowful tale I'll tell,
concerning of a hero bold
who through misfortune fell,
His name it was Ben Hall, a man of high renown,
Who was hunted from his station, and like a dog shot down.

Three years he roamed the roads, and he showed the traps some fun,
One thousand pounds was on his head, with Gilbert and John Dunn.
Ben parted from his comrades, the outlaws did agree,
To give away bushranging and to cross the briny sea.

Ben went to Goobang Creek, and that was his downfall
For riddled like a sieve was the valiant Ben Hall,
'Twas early in the morning upon the fifth of May
That the seven police surrounded him as fast asleep they lay.

Bill Dargin he was chosen to shoot the outlaw dead,
The troopers then fired madly and they filled him full of lead,
They rolled him in his blanket and strapped him to his prad,
And they led him through the streets of Forbes, to show the prize they had.

Explanation
The song recounts how Ben Hall left his station and became a bushranger for 3 years, and was then shot dead by police in 1865.

The song paints Ben Hall in a sympathetic light, and portrays the police as corrupt, brutal and cowardly.

Cultural references
Forbes is a small town in New South Wales, a state of Australia. At the time of Ben Hall, Forbes was part of the Colony of New South Wales, in turn part of the British Empire.

"Lachlan men" refers to people living near the Lachlan River, which runs through Forbes.

A station is a large Australian livestock farm.

"Traps" and "troopers" are old Australian terms for the police.

Gilbert and John Dunn were two other bushrangers who were members of Ben Hall's gang.

Bushrangers were rural outlaws in colonial Australia, who typically engaged in robbery and theft.

Goobang Creek is a small tributary of the Lachlan River.

The Bill Dargin (also known as Billy Dargin) mentioned in the song was an Australian aboriginal tracker employed by the police to find Ben Hall.

"Prad" is old Australian slang for a horse.

"One thousand pounds" refers to the British pound, the currency of Australia during colonial times. In 1910 it was replaced by the Australian pound. In 1966 the Australian dollar became the official currency.

References

Bushrangers
Australian folk songs